Charles Martin vs Anthony Joshua was a professional boxing match contested between the undefeated and newly crowned IBF heavyweight champion Charles Martin, and undefeated Olympic gold medalist Anthony Joshua. The bout took place on 9 April 2016 at The O2 Arena, London. Joshua defeated Martin via second-round knockout (KO) to claim the IBF heavyweight title.

Background

On 12 December 2015, Anthony Joshua fought fellow British contender and rival Dillian Whyte in a grudge match for Joshua's WBC International, and Commonwealth titles with the vacant British title also on the line. The bout took place at The O2 Arena in London, with Joshua winning via seventh-round technical knockout (TKO). 

Following the IBF's decision to strip newly crowned unified champion Tyson Fury of their version of the heavyweight championship for failing to agree terms for a fight with mandatory challenger Vyacheslav Glazkov, due to contractual obligations to face former unified champion Wladimir Klitschko in a rematch, the IBF ordered a fight between Glazkov and #2 ranked contender Charles Martin. The bout took place on 16 January 2016 at the Barclays Center, New York, with Martin winning via third-round TKO after Glazkov suffered a knee injury and was unable to continue. One month after Martin's win over Glazkov, it was announced that Martin would make a voluntary defence of his newly acquired title against Joshua—who was the IBF's #4 ranked contender—with the bout scheduled to take place on 9 April at The O2 Arena in London. It was reported that Martin would earn a career high purse of £3.46m with potential total earnings in excess of £6m after PPV sales.

The fight
Round one saw Martin on the back foot, only throwing a handful of punches and landing even less. Joshua applied minimal pressure, throwing probing jabs to the head and body and the occasional right hand. In the final 30 seconds, Joshua grazed Martin with a straight right hand which appeared to cause the champion to momentarily stumble. However, the instant replay between rounds showed Martin had tripped over one of the ringside advertisements. Martin began standing his ground in the first minute of round two, throwing more punches in that minute than the previous three. One minute into the round, Joshua slipped a right hand jab from southpaw Martin and landed a solid counter straight right to Martin's chin, dropping the champion to the canvas. Five seconds after Martin rose to his feet, he threw another jab which Joshua once again slipped and landed the same counter straight right hand to floor the champion for the second time. Martin was still down on one knee as referee Jean-Pierre Van Imschoot reached the count of nine. Martin quickly rose up to his feet as Van Imschoot waved off the fight at 1 minute and 32 seconds, giving Joshua a second-round knockout win to secure the IBF heavyweight title.

Aftermath
With Joshua's win, he became the first British super-heavyweight Olympic champion to win a professional heavyweight world title; the fourth boxer in history to win a professional heavyweight world title as the reigning Olympic champion; and the fifth-fastest to win a heavyweight world title at two years and six months. Martin also made the heavyweight history books by having the second-shortest reign as a heavyweight world champion at just 85 days.

Fight card

References

2016 in boxing
2016 in British sport
April 2016 sports events in the United Kingdom
2016 sports events in London
International sports competitions in London
International Boxing Federation heavyweight championship matches
Pay-per-view boxing matches
Boxing matches involving Anthony Joshua